This is a list of about 680 former or extant wharves, docks, piers, terminals, etc. of the Port of London, the majority of which lie on the Tideway of the River Thames, listed from upstream to downstream.

Many of the docks closed after the mass uptake of containerisation changed the face of the industry and bringing about an end to an era, and a demise to the occupation of the docker as it then was.

Those marked with a † have at present the status of a safeguarded wharf. Those in italics are no longer used for port or river transit related activities. Further remarks are made in brackets, including in some cases the present operator or cargo handled.

It is estimated that in 1937, at the height of London's trade, there were around 1,700 wharves between Brentford and Gravesend. Today there are around 70 active terminals, each generally handling much greater volumes. Much of the cargo and commodities handling by the Port of London takes place in the downstream stretches of the Thames beyond Greater London, on the banks of south Essex (Thurrock) and north Kent. The Port of London Authority controls operations from its base in Gravesend. The main container terminal is currently at Tilbury, though in 2008 construction began on the London Gateway project, which will become the largest single component of the Port of London when completed.

South bank

Kew
 Kew Gardens Pier

Mortlake and Barnes

(Chiswick Bridge)
 Stag Brewery
 St Mary's Wharf
 site of Mortlake Power Station
 Mortlake Wharf
(Barnes Railway Bridge)
 Small Profits Draw Dock
(Hammersmith Bridge)
 Harrod's Wharf

Putney
 Putney Pier (TfL river service)
(Putney Bridge)
 Putney Wharf
 Douglas Wharf
 Spaldings Wharf
(Fulham Railway Bridge)

Wandsworth

 River Wandle
 Feathers Wharf
 Western Riverside (solid waste transfer station) †
 Wandsworth Riverside Quarter Pier (TfL river service)
 Pier Wharf †
(Wandsworth Bridge)

Battersea

 Sherwood Wharf
 Plantation Wharf, site of Manbre & Gartons works (sugars)
 site of original Price's Candles works
 Shell Wharf
 Bridges Wharf 
 Oyster Wharf
 site of jetty for Lombard Road Power Station
 Regent Wharf
(Battersea Railway Bridge)
 site of original Morgan Crucible Company works
(Battersea Bridge)
 site of C & J Fields candle works
 Ransomes Dock
 site of Albert Bridge flour mills
(Albert Bridge)
(Chelsea Bridge)
 Chelsea Bridge Wharf
 Battersea Wharf
(Grosvenor Bridge)
 former Battersea Power Station
 The Battersea Barge
 Cringle Dock †
 Metro Greenham (RMC Battersea) †

Vauxhall and Lambeth
 Middle Wharf (Cemex Vauxhall) †
 Prescot Wharf
 Bourne Valley Wharf
 St George Wharf
(Vauxhall Bridge)
 Tamesis Dock
 White Hart Draw Dock (river access under the Albert Embankment)
 site of Royal Doulton pottery 
 Lambeth River fire station
 Lambeth Pier
(Lambeth Bridge)
(Westminster Bridge)
 Acre Wharf (now County Hall)
 Waterloo Millennium Pier (TfL river service)
 College Wharf
 India Store Depot
 Bangor Wharf
(Hungerford Bridge)

Southwark

 Festival Pier (TfL river service)
(Waterloo Bridge)
 Old Shot Tower Wharf
 Commercial Wharf
 Waterloo Dock
 New Barge House Wharf
 Old Jamaica Wharf
 Old Bull Stairs Wharf
 Greystone Lane Wharf
 Jamaica Wharf
 Blackfriars Bridge Wharf
(Blackfriars Bridge)
(Blackfriars Railway Bridge)
 Foundry Wharf
 Falcon Draw Dock
 Holland Wharf
 Iron Wharf
 Honduras Wharf
 Willow Wharf
 Royal George Wharf
 former Bankside Power Station
 Travers & Crown Wharf
 Queen's Wharf
 Phoenix Wharf
(Millennium Bridge)
 Devonshire Wharf
 Globe Wharf
 British Lion Wharf
 Greenmoor Wharf
 Stone Wharf
 Bankside Pier/Jetty (TfL river service)
 Emmerson Wharf
 Windsor Wharf
 Benbow Wharf
 Sturtivant Wharf
 Bear Wharf
 Bear Garden Wharf
 St Helen's Wharf
 Cast Iron Wharf
 Scott's Wharf
 Universal Wharf
(Southwark Bridge)
 Imperial Wharf
 Southwark Wharf
 Bridge Wharf
 Ceylon Wharf
 Red Lion Wharf
 Lion Wharf
 Carey's Wharf
 Barclay's Brewery
 Bank End Wharf
(Cannon Street Railway Bridge)
 South Eastern Wharf
 Horseshoe Wharf
 Clink Wharf
 Winchester Wharf
 Phoenix Wharf
 Pickfords Wharf
 St Mary Overie Dock
 West Kent Wharf
  Hibernia Wharf

Upper Pool

(London Bridge)
 Fenning's Wharf 
 Sun Wharf 
 Topping's Wharf 
 St Olaf House (Hay's Wharf offices) 
 Chamberlain's Wharf 
 Cotton's Wharf 
 Humphery's Wharf 
 London Bridge City Pier/Hays Wharf Pier (TfL river service)
 Hay's Dock and Wharf
 Wilson's Wharf 
 Griffin's Wharf 
 South Thames Wharf 
 Gun & Shot Wharves 
 Symon's Wharf 
 Stanton's Wharf 
 St Olave's Wharf 
 Pickle Herring Wharf 
 Mark Brown's Wharf 
 Tower Bridge Wharf 
(Tower Bridge)

Bermondsey

 Burtt's Portland Wharf 
 Anchor Brewhouse 
 Butler's Wharf 
 Horselydown Wharf 
 Coventry's Wharf 
 Cole's Upper and Lower Wharves 
 Newell's Wharf 
 Shad Thames
 St Saviour's Dock
 St Andrew's Wharf 
 Meriton's Wharf, later New Concordia Wharf 
 Reed's Wharf 
 Uveco Wharf
 Deverell's Wharf 
 Downing's Wharf 
 Reed's Lower Wharf 
 Redman's Wharf 
 Springall's Wharf 
 Adlard's Wharf 
 Brunswick Wharf,  later Sterling Wharf
 Seaborne Coal Wharf 
 London Grist Mills 
 East Lane Wharf 
 Chamber's Wharves 
 Bond's Wharf 
 Fountain Dock 
 Darnell's Wharf 
 Fountain Stairs Wharf 
 Powell's Wharf 
 Farrand's Wharf 
 Cherry Garden Wharf 
 Cherry Garden Pier 
 Lucas and Spencer's Wharf

Rotherhithe

  Corbett's Wharf 
 National Wharf 
 Platform Wharf 
 Platform Sufferance Wharf 
 Braithwaite & Dean's Wharf 
 Pace's Wharf 
 Pocock's Barge Yard 
 Cochin Wharf 
 Yardley's Wharf 
 Matthew's Wharf 
 Rotherhithe Wharf 
 Cannon Wharf 
 Abbot's Wharf 
 Gordon's Wharf 
 Prince's Wharf 
 Carr's Wharf 
 Beard's Wharf 
 East India Wharf 
 Bombay Wharf 
 Hope Wharf 
 Thames Tunnel Mills 
 Grice's Wharf 
 Claydon's Wharf 
 Genisi's Wharf 
 Brandram's Wharf 
 Charles Hay's Barge Yard 
 Fisher's Sufferance Wharf 
 Cumberland Wharf 
 Carolina Wharf 
 Ransome's Wharf 
 Norway Wharf 
 Clarence Wharf 
(Rotherhithe Tunnel)
 Dinorwic Wharf 
 Surrey Commercial Docks
 Surrey Commercial Wharf 
 Bull Head Wharf 
 King and Queen Wharf 
 Bellamy's Wharf 
 Prince's Wharf 
 Lower King and Queen Wharf 
 Upper Globe Wharf  (rice); once Upper Globe Dock Shipyard
 Normandy Wharf 
 Crown Lead Works 
 Horseferry Wharf 
 Grand Surrey Wharf 
 Lavender Dock shipyard, later Lavender Wharf  (Castrol)
 Lavender Lock entrance to Lavender Pond
 Pageant Wharf 
 Upper Ordnance Wharf  (Enthoven Lead Works)
 Sunderland Wharf 
 Cuckold's Point, once site of Limehouse Hole ferry
 Canada Wharf, later Columbia Wharf,
 Nelson Dock Pier
 Nelson Dry Dock 
 Danzig Wharf 
 Albion Wharf 
 Somerset Wharf 
 Lawrence's Wharf 
 Durand's Wharf 
 Trinity Wharf 
 Acorn Wharf, later South Wharf 
 Barnard's Wharf, later Odessa Wharf
 Commercial Dock Pier  later Commercial Pier Wharf
 Atkin's Wharf, Redriff Wharf, later New Caledonian Wharf
 Greenland Dock
 Greenland Dock Pier
 South Dock Marina
 St George's Wharf  later site of Manganese Bronze and Brass works

Deptford and Deptford Creek

 Deadman's Dock, later Deadman's Wharf, later Deptford Wharf
 site of Royal Victoria Victualling Yard 
 site of Deptford Supply Reserve Depot, part of the Deptford Dockyard  later the Foreign Cattle Market, later Convoy's Wharf †
 Palmer's Wharf 
 Watergate Stairs, site of Deptford Ferry 
 site of Payne's Paper Wharf 
 site of Borthwick's Cold Stores 
 site of Deptford Power Station 
 site of The Stowage, East India Company shipyard, later General Steam Navigation Co's Deptford Green Dockyard 
 Deptford Creek
 Brewery Wharf (active aggregate wharf)  †

Greenwich

 Phoenix Wharf (Phoenix Gas Light & Coke Co), later Granophast Wharf 
 Dreadnought Yard  (originally J & G Rennie's shipyard)
 Victoria & Norway Wharf 
 site of Greenwich Vehicular Ferry 
 Talbot's Wharf 
 Billingsgate Dock 
 Dodd's Wharf 
(Greenwich foot tunnel)
 Greenwich Pier (TfL river service)
 former Dreadnought Seamen's Hospital (now part of University of Greenwich)
 former Royal Naval College, now National Maritime Museum
 High Bridge Wharf 
 Greenwich Power Station
 Crowley's Wharf 
 Port of London Wharf 
 Union Wharf 
 Greenwich Wharf 
 Lovell’s Wharf  (status as a safeguarded wharf now lost)
 Granite Wharf   (status as a safeguarded wharf now lost)
 Badcock's Wharves 
 Piper's Wharf, Thames craft dry docking

Greenwich Peninsula

 Enderby's Wharf (originally the rope works of a whaling company, subsequently a submarine cable works owned by a succession of firms from Glass Elliot (1857) including STC, currently Alcatel)
 Tunnel Glucose † (formerly Thames Soap and Candle Works)
 Morden Wharf
 Primrose Wharf
 Bay Wharf (site of Maudslay Son & Field shipyard)
 Victoria Deep Water Terminal (Hanson Aggregates; originally Bessemer's steel works; Victoria linoleum; container terminal until the 1990s) †
 Imperial Wharf
 Sussex Wharf
 Delta/Blackwall Wharf(originally Delta Metals brass, bronze etc. works) (major aggregates wharf now lost - redeveloped as part of the Greenwich Peninsula masterplan)
 Draw dock
 Ordnance Wharf (originally Blakely's Ordnance Works making heavy guns)
(Blackwall Tunnel)
 site of Blackwall Point dry dock
 Blackwall Point
 site of South Metropolitan Gas Co's East Greenwich Gas Works
 Queen Elizabeth II Pier (TfL river service) on site of gas works coaling jetty
 Phoenix Wharf
 site of Blackwall Point Power Station

New Charlton

 Peartree Wharf
 Angerstein Wharf † (aggregates wharf with rail head)
 Murphy's Wharf (Tarmac, major existing aggregates terminal)†
 Cory's Barge Works
 Charlton Parish Wharf
 Durham Coal Wharf
 Charlton Wharf
 Charlton Ballast Wharf
 Riverside Wharf † (Tarmac)
 Telegraph Wharf
 Barrier Gardens Pier (Port of London Authority)
 Thames Barrier

Woolwich

 Warspite Wharf (site of Siemens Brothers telegraph works)
 Long's Wharf
 Trinity Wharf
 site of Woolwich Dockyard
 Royal Dockyard Wharf
 Parish Wharf
 Woolwich Free Ferry southern landing stage
 site of Woolwich Power Station
 Woolwich Arsenal Pier (TfL river service)
 site of Woolwich Arsenal
 Margaret or Tripcock Ness
 Cross Ness
Crown Wharf (off Globe Lane)

Belvedere, Erith and Crayford Ness

 Belvedere Incinerator
 site of Belvedere Power Station
 Borax Wharf/Manor Wharf †
 Mulberry Wharf †
 Jenningtree Point
 Pioneer Wharf †
 Albion Wharf † (includes numerous jetties and landing stages)
 RMC Erith (jetty and landing stages) †
 site of BICC cable works
 ADM Erith
 Ballast Wharf
 Chalk Farm Wharf
 Erith Pier (formerly in commercial use, now rebuilt for leisure)
 Garden Wharf
 Railway Wharf (RMC) †
 Standard Wharf †
 European Metal Recycling
 Crayford Ness

Dartford, Greenhithe and Swanscombe

 River Darent
 Littlebrook Power Station
(Dartford Crossing)
 Thames Europort
 CdMR Dartford (ro-ro ferry terminal).
 Johnson's Wharf (aggregates)
 Globe Wharf
 Bell Wharf

Northfleet and Gravesend

 Broadness
 Northfleet Wharf
 Britannia Terminal
 Seacon Terminals Tower Wharf (steel, forest products)
 Robin's Wharf
 Brett Aggregates
 Bevan's Wharf
 Northfleet Terminal (Kimberly-Clark)
 Red Lion Wharf
 Bowater's Wharf
 Fletchers Wharf, Gravesend
 Baltic Wharf
 West Street Pier
 Commercial Wharf
 Town Wharf, Gravesend
 Gravesend–Tilbury Ferry landing stages
 Town Pier, Gravesend
 Royal Terrace Pier and landing stage, Gravesend (headquarters of the Port of London Authority)
 Custom House Pier, Gravesend
 Gravesend Canal Basin
 Denton Wharf and Jetty, Gravesend (owned by the Port of London Authority and main base for PLA vessels)
 Jetty (Metropolitan Police training centre)
 Clubb's Marine Terminal (sea-dredged aggregates)

Cliffe
 North Sea Terminal (sea-dredged aggregates)
 Lower Hope Point
 Yantlet Creek

Below here lie the Medway ports including Thamesport, a container port on the site of BP's Kent oil refinery on the Isle of Grain and Sheerness on the Isle of Sheppey. These are not part of the Port of London.

North bank

Isleworth
 Lion Wharf
 Town Wharf
 Bridge Wharf

Brentford and Strand-on-the-Green
 Brentford Dock (formerly a major trans-shipment point between the river and the Great Western Railway)
 River Brent and Grand Union Canal entrance
 site of Thames Soap Works
 Point Wharf
 Goat Wharf
(Kew Bridge)
 Ball's Wharf
 Magnolia Wharf
(Kew Railway Bridge)

Chiswick
(Chiswick Bridge)
(Barnes Railway Bridge)
 Lep Wharf
 Chiswick Pier
 River Wharf
 Church Wharf, site of Thornycroft's first torpedo boat yard, later Cherry Blossom shoe polish
 Chiswick Wharf
 Fuller's Griffin Brewery
 Chiswick Draw Dock
 Durham Wharf
 St Peter's Wharf

Hammersmith
 Albert Wharf
 Atlanta Wharf
 Beckett's Wharf
 Hope Wharf
(Hammersmith Bridge)
 Queen's Wharf
 Gwynne's Wharf
 Chancellor's Wharf

Fulham and Sands End

 Distillery Wharf (site of Haig distillery)
 site of Manbre's sugar works (later Manbre & Garton)
 Duckham's Wharf (formerly Duckham's Motor Oil works)
 Thames Wharf
 Dorset Wharf (formerly Anglo-American Oil Company)
 Tea Rose Jetty and Wharf
 Greyhound Wharf
 Palace Wharf
 Crabree Wharf
 Crabtree Draw Dock
 Wheatsheaf Wharf
 Rosebank Wharf
 Redline Wharf
 Blakes Wharves
 National Benzole Wharf
 Eternit Wharf
 Stevenage Wharf
(Putney Bridge)
 Swan Wharf
 Carrara Wharf
 Willowbank Wharf
(Fulham Railway Bridge)
 Broomhouse Draw Dock
 Petrofina Wharf
 Whiffin Wharf
 Hurlingham Wharf †
 Trinidad Wharf (former asphalt wharf)
(Wandsworth Bridge)
 Albert Wharf
 Swedish Wharf †
 Comley's Wharf (RMC Fulham) †
 Fulham Wharf
 site of Fulham Power Station
 Shell Wharf
 Lensbury Wharf
 site of Imperial Gas Works pier
 Nacovia Wharf
(Battersea Railway Bridge)
 Chelsea Harbour Pier (TfL river service)
 Chelsea Harbour marina (formerly Chelsea Basin)

Chelsea

 Counter's Creek
 former Lots Road Power Station
 Cremorne Wharf †
 Chelsea Wharf
 Durham Wharf
(Albert Bridge)
 Cadogan Pier (TfL river service)

Westminster and City of London
(Chelsea Bridge)
 Grosvenor Canal
(Grosvenor Bridge)
 Dinorvic Wharf, now Westminster Boating Base 
 St George's Wharf 
 Somerset Wharf 
 Chester Wharf 
 Eagle Wharf 
(Vauxhall Bridge)
 Baltic Wharf, site of Castle's Shipbreaking Company
 Millbank Millennium Pier (TfL river service)
(Lambeth Bridge)
(Westminster Bridge)
 Westminster Millennium Pier (TfL river service)
 PS Tattershall Castle
 RS Hispaniola
(Hungerford Bridge)
 Embankment Pier (TfL river service)
 Savoy Pier
 TS Queen Mary
(Waterloo Bridge)
 Temple Pier
 The Yacht (formerly PLA yacht St Katherine)
 HMS President
 Blackfriars Millennium Pier (TfL river service)
(Blackfriars Bridge)
(Blackfriars Railway Bridge)

 Puddle Dock
 Wheatsheaf Wharf
 England Wharf
 Crown Wharf
 Horseshoe Wharf
 Anchor Wharf
 Castle Baynard Dock
 Lion Wharf
 Paul's Wharf
(Millennium Bridge)

 Trig Wharf
 Broken Wharf
 Brook's Wharf
Stew Lane Stairs 
 Maidstone Wharf
 Queenhithe Dock
Queenhithe Stairs
 Kennet Wharf
Southwark Bridge Stairs
(Southwark Bridge)
 Bell Wharf
 Dowgate Dock
 Kennet Wharf
 Walbrook Wharf (waste transfer station) †
Cousin Lane Stairs
(Cannon Street Railway Bridge)
 Allhallows Lane Stairs leading to Allhallows Pier
 Red Bull Wharf
 Dyers' Hall Wharf
 Commercial Wharf
 Old Swan Stairs leading to Old Swan Pier/Dolphin Pontoon
 Old Swan Wharf
 City Pier and Fishmongers Hall Wharf

Upper Pool

(London Bridge)
 London Bridge Wharf 
(Site of Old London Bridge)
 Fresh Wharf 
 Cox and Hammond's Wharf 
Botolph Wharf
 Nicholson's Wharf 
Somers Quay Stairs
 Grant's Quay Wharf
 Billingsgate Market 
Custom House Stairs West
 Custom House Wharf 
Custom House Stairs East
 Custom House and Wool Quays 
 Galley Dock and Quay 
 Chester Quay 
 Brewer's Quay 
 Tower Dock
Tower Stairs
 Tower Millennium Pier (TfL river service)
(Tower Bridge)

Wapping and Shadwell

 Irongate Wharf 
 St Katharine Wharf 
 St Katharine Docks
 Tower Bridge Quay (TfL river service)
 Harrison's Wharf 
 South Devon Wharf 
 British and Foreign Wharves 
 HMS President, a stone frigate
 Miller's Wharf 
 Carron Wharf 
 London and Continental Steam Wharf
(Hermitage entrance to London Docks)
 Hermitage Steam Wharf 
 Colonial Wharves 
 Standard Wharves 
 Watson's Wharf 
 Black Eagle Wharf 
 Brewers Wharf 
 Albion Wharf 
 Hasties Wharf 
 St Helens Wharf 
(Wapping entrance to London Docks)
 Oliver's Wharf 
 Orient Wharf 
 Gun Wharf 
 St John's Wharf 
 Morocco Wharf 
 Eagle Sufferance Wharf 
 Eagle Wharf 
 Baltic Wharf 
 Old Aberdeen Wharf 
 Wapping Police Station
 St John's Wharf 
 Sun Wharf 
 Swan Wharf 
 Tunnel Pier 
 King Henry's Wharves 
 Gibb's Wharf 
 Gun Wharves 
 Middleton and St Bride's Wharf 
 Foundry Wharf 
 St Hilda's Wharf 
 New Crane Wharves 
 Lower Oliver's Wharf 
 Lushes Wharf 
 Metropolitan Wharf 
 Thorpe's and Queen Wharf 
 Pelican Wharf 
(Shadwell New Entrance to Shadwell Basin and London Docks)

Stepney (formerly Ratcliff) and Limehouse

 Sea-borne Coal Wharf
 Bowle's Wharf 
 Free Trade Wharf 
 Hubbuck's Wharf 
  Ratcliff Cross Wharf 
 Lendrum's Wharf 
 Phoenix Wharf 
 Trinity Ballast Wharf 
 Marriage's Wharf
 Roneo Wharf 
 London Wharf 
 Crown Mill Wharf 
 Eagle Wharf 
 New Sun Wharf 
 Vanes Wharf 
 Oporto Wharf 
 Old Sun Wharf 
 Chinnock's Wharf 
 entrance to Limehouse Basin (formerly Regent's Canal Dock) 
 Victoria Wharf 
 (former entrance to Limehouse Cut) 
 Hough's Wharf 
 Dover Wharf 
 Blyth Wharf, site of Stepney Power Station 
 Broadway Wharf 
 Etheridge's Wharf 
 Fielder's Wharf 
 Lamb's Wharf 
 Sparks' Wharf 
 Moline Wharf 
 Duke Shore Wharf 
 Anchor Wharf 
 Dunbar Wharf 
 Limekiln Dock 
 Dundee Wharf 
 River Plate Wharf 
 Limehouse Pier
 Buchanan's Wharf 
 Aberdeen Wharf

Millwall

 Mallinson's Wharf 
 Bridge Wharf  (site of original West India Docks Limehouse Upper Entrance)
 Charrington Barge Yard 
 Locke's Wharf 
 Union Docks, later Union Docks Wharf 
 Canary Wharf Pier (TfL river service)
(site of original West India Docks Limehouse Lower Entrance) 
 Morton's Sufferance Wharf 
 West India Dock Pier
 Batson's & Regents Wharves 
 Regent Dry Dock 
 Oak Wharf 
 London Wharf 
 Bullivant Wharf  later Express Wharf  (Seacon London Steel Terminal, moved to Northfleet late 1990s)
 Hutching's Wharf 
 Ocean Wharf 
 Lion Wharf 
 Lollar Wharf 
 Glengall Wharf 
 site of Atlas Chemical Company, later Atlas Wharf 
 Timothy's Wharf 
 Mellish Wharf  later Arnhem Wharf 
 Fenner's Wharf  later  Klein's Wharf 
(site of original Millwall Dock entrance) 
 Phoenix Wharf 
 Snowdon's Wharf 
 Winkley's Wharf 
 Cyclops Wharf (site of Le Bas Tube Co works)
 site of Millwall Pier 
 Victoria Wharf  (site of Crosse & Blackwell, later Le Bas Tube Co works)
 Anchor Wharf (site of Brown, Lenox & Co chain and anchor works) 
 Cutler's Wharf (site of Providence Iron Works, makers of boilers, gas holders etc.)
 Masthouse Terrace Pier
 site of Drunken Dock, later Ferguson's Wharf, Rose's Wharf  and St Andrew's Wharf 
 site of Tindall's Dry Dock, later Britannia Dock 
 Guelph Wharf 
 site of Napier Yard and Millwall Iron Works 
 Venesta Wharf 
 Burrell's Wharf (site of Burrell's & Co's paint works)
 Maconochie's Wharf 
 Nelson Wharf 
 Clyde Wharf, later Langbourn Wharf, later Shaw's Wharf 
 site of Millwall Lead Works, later Locke's Wharf 
 St David's Wharf  (site of Manganese, Bronze & Brass Co, propeller makers)
 site of Antimony Works, later Owen Parry's Wharf 
 site of Greenwich Vehicular Ferry,
 Port of London Wharf, later Felstead Wharf 
 Victoria Wharf, later Millwall Boiler Works 
 Livingston Wharf 
 Midland Oil Wharf 
 Johnson's Draw Dock 
 Calder's Wharf 
(Greenwich Foot Tunnel)

Cubitt Town

 Honduras Wharf, later Lukach Wharf then Luralda Wharf
 Invicta Wharf
 Cumberland Mills
  Newcastle Draw Dock
 Grosvenor Wharf
 Alpha Wharf
 Poplar Dry Dock later Empire Wharf
  Storer's Wharf
 Caledonian Wharf
 Falcon Wharf
 Cubitt Town Wharf
  Plymouth Wharf
 Pyrimont Wharf
 Dudgeon's Wharf (formerly shipbuilding yard of J & W Dudgeon)
 Plough Wharf, later part of Millwall Wharf
 London Yard (Westwood, Baillie & Co shipyard; Yarrows; Morton's jam factory)
 former site of Samuda Brothers shipyard
 Elmer's Wharf
 New Union Wharf
 site of Blackwall Iron Works later Ovex Wharf
 Slipway Wharf
  Canal Dockyard
 entrance to West India Docks

Blackwall and Leamouth

 Concordia Wharf
 North Wharf
 entrance to Poplar Dock and West India Docks via Blackwall Basin
 Northumberland Wharf † (now a waste transfer station)
 Blackwall Stairs
 Ashton Wharf
 site of Blackwall Yard (part later Midland Railway's Poplar Dock)
 Brunswick Wharf
 site of Brunswick Wharf Power Station
 entrance to East India Docks
 East India Dock Wharf
 Orchard Wharf †
 Trinity Buoy Wharf
( Bow Creek)

Canning Town
 Eastern site of Thames Ironworks and Shipbuilding Company
 Priors Wharf (Lower Lea Valley/Bow Creek) †
 Mayer Parry Wharf (EMR Canning Town) (Lower Lea Valley/Bow Creek) †
 Phoenix Wharf
 Thames Wharf †
(site of original upper entrance to Royal Victoria Dock)

Silvertown

 Odam's Wharf (originally chemical manure works, later Fisons)
 Clyde Wharf (originally Duncan, Bell & Scott sugar refinery, later United Alkali Company)
 Hall's Wharf
 Alexandra Wharf (formerly Carlsberg)
 Pinchin's Wharf (formerly Nuplex resins (originally Pinchin Johnson & Associates paints, later AkzoNobel))
 Peruvian Wharf (originally Peruvian Guano Wharf) †
 Plaistow Wharf; Tate & Lyle Golden Syrup works (now supplied from main site)
 Royal Primrose Wharf, site of Royal Primrose soap works 
 Manhattan Wharf †
 Mohawk Wharf
 Lyle Park
 Venesta Wharf (no longer usable) (formerly Venesta plywood factory, later Aluminium Foils Ltd)
 Deanston Wharf
 Sunshine Wharf †
 Crescent Wharf (formerly Brunner Mond, site of Silvertown explosion, later ICI), now Royal Wharf
 Minoco Wharf (Minoco, later Gulf Lubricants), now Royal Wharf
 Prince Regent's Wharf (originally Burt, Boulton & Haywood chemical works), now Thames Barrier Park
 Thames Barrier northern end
 Ward's Wharf
 Thames Road Industrial Estate
 Tay Wharf (formerly Keiller's marmalade factory, later Crosse & Blackwell)
 site of Silver's India Rubber, Gutta Percha & Telegraph Co works (later BTR Industries), now Thameside Industrial Estate
 Tate & Lyle Thames Refinery and jetty
 Cairn Mills (formerly Loders & Nucoline, later Loders Croklaan oil seed works)

North Woolwich
 site of Western Electric Co's cable works (later STC)
 site of W.T. Henley's submarine cable works (later AEI)
 Woolwich Free Ferry north pier
 Woolwich foot tunnel
 Hoba Wharf
 Gallions Point
 site of Harland & Wolff ship repairers
 entrance to Royal Docks (remains in use for boat exhibitioning)
 site of filled South Entrance to basin of Royal Albert Dock
 North Entrance to basin of Royal Albert Dock, now used for Gallions Point Marina

Beckton
 Gallions Jetty (formerly Cory & Son)
 New Beckton Wharf (formerly BP)
 site of Beckton Gas Works and coaling piers
 Beckton Reach Sewerage Works Pier

Barking Creek
The following wharves are located on the lower section of the River Roding, at Creekmouth.
 Welbeck Wharf †
 Pinns Wharf †
 Kierbeck & Steel Wharves †
 Debden Wharf (recently improved) †
 Rippleway Wharf †
 Alexander Wharf (no longer usable)
 Maple Wharf (in use?)
 Bowen Wharf (backland built over; not usable)
 New Free Trade Wharf (backland built over; not usable)
 Dockland Construction Wharf (has been redeveloped into industrial units)
 Docklands Wharf †
 Victoria Stone Wharf †

Creekmouth
 Lawes Wharf
 DePass Wharf †
 Barking or False Point
 original site of Barking Power Station
 Barking Riverside Recycling Plant

Dagenham Dock
 RMC Roadstone †
 No 7 Jetty (ex-Rugby Cement) (currently vacant)
 Thunderer Jetty (TDG Dagenham, now Norbert Dentressangle - petrol, distillates, aviation fuel, biofuels, tallow, ethanol, fertilisers, urea etc.)
 Pinnacle Terminal †
 White Mountain Roadstone †
 Hunts Wharf (Van Dalen) †
 Stolthaven Dagenham (fuel and oils)
 Hanson Aggregates †
 Ford Dagenham Terminal †

Rainham
 Phoenix Wharf/Frog Island †
 site of Murex works
 Tilda Rice †
 Veolia jetty and landfill site
 Coldharbour Point

Purfleet

 Mar Dyke
 Esso - ExxonMobil (liquid bulks – petroleum products, lubricants and solvents)
 CLdN Purfleet (RO-RO ferries)
 Jurgen's Jetty (Pura Foods)
 Van den Bergh Jetty (Unilever margarine works – edible oils)
 Civil & Marine Jetty (Upper & Lower)
 Purfleet Aggregates
(Dartford Crossing)

West Thurrock and Grays
 Lafarge Jetty (sea-dredged aggregates)
 Thurrock Marine Terminal (dry bulk cement)
 Navigator Terminals Ltd. (formerly Vopak Terminal London) (liquid bulks - petroleum products and chemicals - liquid fertilisers, gases; vegetable oils and fats)
 Stone Ness
 West Thurrock Jetty (ICL chemical works - dry bulks; chemical powders)
 Procter & Gamble detergent works
 Gibbs Wharf (dry bulk - limestone aggregate, coal and other minerals)
 Nustar Grays Terminal (diesel, gas oil, paraffin, petrol, ethanol)
 Bruce's Wharf
 Goldsmith's Wharf

Tilbury
See Port of Tilbury for the main dock system.
 Tilbury Grain Terminal (cereals)
 Northfleet Hope Terminal (containers)
 Tilbury Ness
 London International Cruise Terminal, Tilbury
 Tilbury 2 roll on/roll off terminal (formerly Tilbury Power Station)
 East Tilbury landfill wharf
 Coalhouse Point
 Mucking wharf (refuse)

Shell Haven, Coryton, Canvey Island and Southend
 London Gateway port, formerly Shell Haven oil refinery
 Thames Haven
 Thames Oilport, formerly Coryton Refinery 
 Hole Haven, proposed (1972) Occidental refinery, unused jetties extant
 Oikos Storage, formerly London & Coastal Oil Wharves Ltd, Canvey Island 
 Texaco Ltd, formerly Regent Oil Company, Canvey Island (closed 1985)
 Calor Gas Terminal, formerly North Thames Gas Board/British Gas Corporation, Canvey Island
 Deadman's Point
 Billet wharf, Leigh-on-Sea (shellfish)
 Victoria wharf
 Strand wharf
 Bell wharf, Leigh-on-Sea
 Crow Stone, Southend (former seaward limit of Port of London)
 Southend Pier
 Southend Corporation loading pier
 Gas works pier, Southend
 Barge pier, Shoeburyness
 Gog's Berth, Shoeburyness

References

 Mander, David, Notes to West India Docks 1914, London Sheet 79 of Old Ordnance Survey Maps, The Godfrey Edition, Alan Godfrey, 1991,

External links

Safeguarded Wharves - the official 2005 list and descriptions
The Port of London today - many of the present-day terminals
London Yard - Dockland's best kept secret
Sweet taste of history - Manbre and Garton, Fulham

Infrastructure in London

Port of London
Por